Hangzhou Foreign Languages School (HFLS) (Chinese: 杭州外国语学校 (simp.)/杭州外國語學校 (trad.)), colloquially referred to as "Hangwai"(杭外), is a grade 7–12 public high school located in Hangzhou, Zhejiang, China. Founded in 1964, HFLS is one of the country's first eight foreign language schools, and is one of the country's most prestigious. As stipulated by the Ministry of Education, 20% of the students from each graduating class are exempted from the National Higher Education Entrance Examination and are instead directly admitted into top Chinese universities.

History
In 1963, a shortage of qualified recruits for diplomatic service led the new Chinese government in Beijing to adopt new policies aimed at producing an institutionalized recruitment pool of talented students proficient in foreign languages through primary and secondary education. Hangzhou Foreign Languages School was thus established, together with seven other equivalent foreign language schools in the cities of Shanghai, Beijing, Changchun, Nanjing, Xi'an, Chongqing and Wuhan.

In 1964, the middle school division of the HFLS was located on the campus of the Affiliated Middle School Attached to Hangzhou University, known today as Xuejun Middle School; whereas the primary school division was established, located on the campus of Zhejiang Infant Normal School. The latter half of the HFLS had to move around twice before 1966, when the two divisions of the HFLS merged into one single institution located on Zhejiang Infant Normal School's campus.

As the Cultural Revolution began that same year, the HFLS stopped recruiting new students, and current students left the school after 1969, with students in the primary school division being transferred to elementary schools nearby and all HFLS's middle school students joining the "Down to the Countryside Movement." The HFLS faculty, with the exception of English teachers, were all told to leave.

The school was able to recover and rejuvenate institutionally after the Cultural Revolution ended, and became a grade 7-12 high school. In 1991, the HFLS moved into a new campus on Academy Road. In September 2003, the school moved again into its brand new suburban campus on Liuhe Road, and as a result, was able to drastically expand the size of its student body.
In January 2016, the HFLS relocated for another time to a new, smaller campus further to the west on Liuhe Road, after decisions were made to downsize the school and revoke many of its longstanding privileges in recruitment and admission that had been instrumental to its erstwhile success.

Admission
Hangzhou Foreign Languages School had been the only school allowed to conduct entrance exams for elementary school graduates in Zhejiang Province. During the 1990s, elementary schools in Hangzhou, the capital of Zhejiang,  were given a quota of one student for each class, normally the top student. Together with students recommended for their special talents in arts and music, around 1,000 students in the city sat the written exams of Mathematics and Chinese, after which around 100 students were qualified for second stage interviews and 80 students aged around 13 to 14 were finally admitted, forming 2 classes in entering grade 7.

Due to the pressure from other secondary schools, the entrance exams of Hangzhou Foreign Language School evolved towards the form of pure interviews after 2000. The candidates pool was extended to all elementary schools in Zhejiang Province while both the candidates quota and number of admissions expanded, recruiting 11 to 12 classes each year.

In 2009, the Department of Education of Zhejiang announced that the school will become an affiliate of the then newly established Zhejiang International Studies University, which caused the school to stop conducting entrance interviews. The decision of affiliation was later revoked in reaction to the dissatisfaction from students and faculty, but the school opted to have a lottery process in selecting students.

Cambridge A-Level Center
Hangzhou Foreign Languages School was accredited in 2008 as an International Examination Center by the University of Cambridge International Examinations (CIE). As a result, Dipont Education, in collaboration with the HFLS administration, established a new division within the school called "Cambridge A-Level Center (CAL)," which serves a small number of gifted students from grade 10 to grade 12. At the CAL Center, IGCSE and British A-Level courses are offered with English as the primary language of instruction.

Since the class of 2017, HFLS students enrolled at the CAL Center have been required to also finish the standard high school curriculum of Zhejiang Province, whose subjects include Chinese, arts, music, Chinese history, geography, political science, information technology and physical education.

The student government plays an important role in student life at the CAL Center, as its members regularly organize events celebrating different Chinese and Western holidays, such as the New Year's Day, Christmas, and Halloween, in addition to also overseeing the operations of all the student clubs at the CAL Center.

Alumni
Xi Mingze (Daughter of Chinese paramount leader Xi Jinping and folk singer Peng Liyuan)
 Chen Jian (politician) (Member of Ministry of Commerce, Assistant Minister)
 Colin Huang (Founder and former CEO of Pinduoduo)
 Frank Wang (Founder and CEO of DJI)

Athletics
Athletics teams from the school have accumulated numerous accolades in municipal and provincial contests, among which are:
 3rd place in Hangzhou Cheerleading Contest in 2004 and 2017
 5th place in Hangzhou High School Women's Soccer Contest in 2009
 4th place in Men's Soccer Contest in 2012
 4th place in Hangzhou High School Women's Volleyball Contest in 2012
 1st place in Hangzhou Middle School Aerobics Contest from 2006 to 2014
 5th place in Zhejiang Student Pingpong Contest(Hangzhou division), women's category

See also
 Nanjing Foreign Language School
 Shanghai Foreign Language School

References

External links
 
 Official website of HFLS in Chinese
 Official website of HFLS in English
 HFLS alumni associations

Foreign-language high schools in China
Education in Hangzhou